Andreas Maercker (born 26 April 1960) is a German clinical psychologist and international expert in traumatic stress-related mental disorders who works in Switzerland. He also contributed to lifespan and sociocultural aspects of trauma sequelae, e.g. the Janus-Face model of posttraumatic growth.

Biography 
Andreas Maercker studied medicine and psychology in East Germany. He graduated as M.D. in 1986 at the Humboldt University of Berlin. From 1988 to 1989 he was a political prisoner in the GDR for ten months due to an escape attempt to the Federal Republic (sentenced to two years in prison and earlier "redeemed" by the Federal Republic of Germany). In 1995 he graduated as Ph.D. with a study conducted at the Max Planck Institute for Human Development in Berlin supervised by psychologist Paul B. Baltes. In 1999, he became a psychology professor at TU Dresden. Since 2005, he holds the chair of Psychopathology and Clinical Intervention at the University of Zurich. Since 2011, he has chaired the working group "Stress-associated disorders" for ICD-11 revision by World Health Organization. In 1998, he co-founded the German language Society for Psychotraumatology (Deutschsprachige Gesellschaft für Psychotraumatologie) and served as its president. In 2017, he also co-founded the European Association for Clinical Psychology and Psychological Treatment (EACLIPT) and serves as its secretary. Starting in 2017, he is chairperson of the commission "Instrumentalization of Psychology in the GDR" of the German Psychological Society on Stasi psychology.

Work 
International contributions of his work are a new diagnosis model of adjustment disorder, the introduction of complex post-traumatic stress disorder and prolonged grief disorder to ICD-11. In PTSD research he developed assessments of socio-interpersonal risk and protective factors: "Disclosure of trauma questionnaire (Dysfunctional disclosure)", "Social acknowledgement as victim", and "Revised Sense of Coherence Scale" that had been translated into Polish, Bahasia Indonesian, and Chinese. Based on these factors he developed the "Social interpersonal model of PTSD". This model posits that social and interpersonal factors play a more central role than biological factors or memory-related alterations. Currently, the model gets extended into cultural factors relevant to PTSD (e.g. values, scripts).
With regard to lifespan consequences of trauma he developed the "Janus-Face-Model of posttraumatic growth" (together with Tanja Zöllner). This model differentiates previous uniformly positive models of post-traumatic growth.
Other models of mental disorder or phenomena development concern, e.g. the "motivational reserve" (parallel to cognitive reserve) (with S. Forstmeier) of older people which is based on life and learning history resources and is assumed to temporarily compensate for a dementia-induced reduction in intelligence and general abilities.
In intervention research, he was one of the early developers of Internet interventions for posttraumatic stress, prolonged grief disorder, adjustment disorder in German language and other languages. In 2020, he was among the 'Highly Cited Researchers' of the year, recognized annually by Web of Science for their exceptional research performance.

Awards 
 In 2004, the award for Anthropological and Humanistic Psychology by the Margrit-Egnér-Foundation.
 In 2017, the Order of Merit of the Federal Republic of Germany in recognition of his scientific work and working in honorary capacity in psychotraumatology and the clinical care of traumatized persons.
 In 2017, the Wolter de Loos Award for Distinguished Contribution to Psychotraumatology in Europe from the European Society for Traumatic Stress Studies for his scientific work.
 In 2018–2019, Fellow at the Berlin Institute for Advanced Studies.

Main international publications 
 Maercker, A., Brewin, C. R., Bryant, R. A., Cloitre, M., Ommeren, M., Jones, L. M., ... & Somasundaram, D. J. (2013). Diagnosis and classification of disorders specifically 
 Linden, M. & Maercker, A. (Eds.) (2010). Embitterment: Societal, psychological, and clinical perspectives. Wien: Springer. 
 Maercker, A. (2017). Trauma und Traumafolgestörungen. München: Beck'sche Reihe. 
 Maercker, A., Schützwohl, M. & Solomon, Z. (Eds.) (2008). Post-Traumatic Stress Disorder: A Lifespan Developmental Perspective. Seattle: Hogrefe & Huber. 
 Maercker, A., Heim, E. & Kirmayer, L. J. (Eds.) (2019). Cultural clinical psychology and PTSD. Boston: Hogrefe. 
 Maercker, A. (Ed.) (2022). Trauma sequelae. Berlin: SpringerNature.

See also 
List of recipients of the Order of Merit of the Federal Republic of Germany

References 

Living people
Clinical psychologists
Humboldt University of Berlin alumni
Recipients of the Cross of the Order of Merit of the Federal Republic of Germany
Academic staff of the University of Zurich
German medical writers
1960 births